Kim Byeong-yeon (born April 5, 1994) is a South Korean football player.

Playing career
Kim Byeong-yeon played for J2 League club; Roasso Kumamoto from 2014 to 2015.

References

External links

1994 births
Living people
South Korean footballers
J2 League players
Roasso Kumamoto players
Association football midfielders